Saint-Gédéon or  is a municipality in Quebec, Canada, in the regional county municipality of Lac-Saint-Jean-Est and the administrative region of Saguenay–Lac-Saint-Jean. It is on the eastern shore of Lac Saint-Jean at the mouth of the Belle River.

Demographics
Population trend:
 Population in 2011: 2001 (2006 to 2011 population change: 3.6%)
 Population in 2006: 2351
 Population in 2001: 2392
 Population in 1996: 1760
 Population in 1991: 1640

Private dwellings occupied by usual residents: 846 (total dwellings: 1181)

Mother tongue:
 English as first language: 0.5%
 French as first language: 99.5%
 English and French as first language: 0%
 Other as first language: 0%

Religion 
According to the Institut de la statistique du Québec, Roman Catholicism had  adherents in the municipality in 2001, with more than 96% of the population concentrated in one parish, Saint-Antoine-de-Padoue. There were 55 atheists (3%), and 15 Protestants (1%). Residents of Saint-Gédéon belonging to other religions represented less than 1% of the population.

There is a Roman Catholic cemetery, cimetière Saint-Antoine-de-Padoue. Saint-Gédéon has a permanent deacon, Daniel Audy, M.A., who was ordained by Mgr Couture, on June 7, 1991 of the feast day of the Sacred Heart.

Culture 
Louis Hémon wrote the first draft of Maria Chapdelaine while staying in Saint-Gédéon in 1912.

Transportation 

The Blueberry Cycling Route (La véloroute des Bleuets in French), part of the Route Verte, goes through Saint-Gédéon.

Images

See also
 List of municipalities in Quebec

References

 Commission de toponymie du Québec
 Affaires municipales et régions - cartes régionales

Bibliography

French
 Christine Côté, Louanges d'un siècle, St-Gédéon: Paroisse Saint-Antoine, 1984, 94 pages
 Johanne Laberge et collaborateurs, Itinéraire toponymique du Saguenay Lac St-Jean , Commission de toponymie du Québec, 1983, 101 pages
 René Raymond, Pédologie de la région du Lac-Saint-Jean, Québec : Ministère de l'agriculture et de la colonisation, Division des sols, 1965, 157 pages
 Mère Sainte-Hélène, N.D.B.C., Saint-Gédéon de Grandmont célèbre son centenaire, 1864-1964, Saint-Gédéon, 1964, 184 pages
 Victor Tremblay, « Saint-Gédéon », Saguenayensia Volume 6, numéro 3, mai-juin 1964, page 64
 .

External links 

 Site officiel de la fête nationale à Saint-Gédéon

Incorporated places in Saguenay–Lac-Saint-Jean
Municipalities in Quebec